Jama Ahmed Mohamed is a Somali politician. He is the Minister of Energy and Water of Somalia, having been appointed to the position on 17 January 2014 by Prime Minister Abdiweli Sheikh Ahmed.

References

Living people
Government ministers of Somalia
Year of birth missing (living people)